Odostomella doliolum is a species of minute sea snail, a marine gastropod mollusc within the family Pyramidellidae, the pyrams and their allies.

Description 
The maximum recorded shell length is 2.2 mm.

Habitat 
The minimum recorded depth for this species is 33 m. The maximum recorded depth is 101 m.

Distribution
This marine species occurs in the following locations:
 Mediterranean Sea
 Atlantic Ocean off Cape Verde, Madeira and the Canary Islands.

References

External links
 Encyclopedia of Life

Pyramidellidae
Gastropods described in 1844
Molluscs of the Atlantic Ocean
Molluscs of the Mediterranean Sea
Molluscs of Madeira
Molluscs of the Canary Islands
Gastropods of Cape Verde